Auguste Fisse was a French dancer and ballet master of the 18th century.

Biography 
A dancer in Turin in Italy in 1762, then in Lille in 1768 and 1769, he was hired at the Théâtre de la Monnaie in Brussels in 1774. Appointed premier danseur and ballet master with Laurent Bocquet the following year, he left Brussels at the end of the 1777-1778 season. He danced in Maastricht in June 1778, then settled in Ghent where he was dance master until 1786.

His last known job was ballet master at the Grand Théâtre de Bordeaux, from 1789 to 1791.

18th-century French ballet dancers
French ballet masters
French male ballet dancers
Year of birth unknown
Year of death unknown